Geoff Linke (born 21 November 1955) is  a former Australian rules footballer who played with St Kilda in the Victorian Football League (VFL)	and South Adelaide in the South Australian National Football League (SANFL).

Notes

External links 
		
		

Living people
1955 births
Australian rules footballers from South Australia
St Kilda Football Club players
South Adelaide Football Club players
Sandringham Football Club players